The 1987 New Jersey General Assembly election was held on November 5, 1987.

The elections took place midway through Governor Tom Kean's second term in office. Democrats won back eight seats, narrowing the Republican majority to four.

Incumbents not running for re-election

Democratic 

 Joseph L. Bocchini Jr. (District 14) (ran for Mercer County Executive)
 Thomas H. Paterniti (District 18) (ran for State Senate)
 Vincent O. Pellecchia (District 35)

Republican 

 Guy F. Muziani (District 1)
 Joseph W. Chinnici (District 1)
 Joseph Azzolina (District 13) (ran for State Senate)
 John K. Rafferty (District 14)
 Charles J. Catrillo (District 32) (ran for State Senate)
 Louis Kosco (District 38) (ran for State Senate)

Summary of races 
Voters in each legislative district elect two members to the New Jersey General Assembly.

District 1

General election

District 2

General election

District 3

General election

District 4

General election

District 5

General election

District 6

General election

District 7

General election

District 8

General election

District 9

General election

District 10

General election

District 11

General election

District 12

General election

District 13

General election

District 14

General election

District 15

General election

District 16

General election

District 17

General election

District 18

General election

District 19

General election

District 20

General election

District 21

General election

District 22

General election

District 23

General election

District 24

General election

District 25

General election

District 26

General election

District 27

General election

District 28

General election

District 29

General election

District 30

General election

District 31

General election

District 32

General election

District 33

General election

District 34

General election

District 35

General election

District 36

General election

District 37

General election

District 38

General election

District 39

General election

District 40

General election

Notes

References 

1987
New Jersey General Assembly
1987 New Jersey elections